Al-Da'ais is a sub-district located in Ba'dan District, Ibb Governorate, Yemen. Al-Da'ais had a population of 9790 as of 2004.

References 

Sub-districts in Ba'dan District